Sæwulf ( 1102 – 1103) was probably the first English pilgrim to Jerusalem following its conquest in the First Crusade. His Latin written account of his pilgrimage tells of an arduous and dangerous journey; and Sæwulf's descriptive narrative provides scholars brief but significant insight into sea travel across the Mediterranean to the new Kingdom of Jerusalem that was established soon after the end of the First Crusade.

History 
Jerusalem fell to the forces of the First Crusade in 1099 after a successful siege of the city. Sæwulf's telling of his travels on pilgrimage to the Holy Land start in Apulia on 13 July 1102 with his boarding ship at Monopoli. Via many ports, he made landfall at Jaffa and began a tour of Palestine, including Jericho and Hebron.

The narrative of his journey to Jerusalem described the prevailing lawlessness of the Judean hills at the time. He noted the road between Jaffa and Jerusalem "was very dangerous...because the Saracens are continually plotting an ambush...day and night always keeping a lookout for someone to attack". For Jerusalem, Sæwulf related guidebook-like details highlighting important sites for pilgrims, including the famous Church of the Holy Sepulchre.

For his return journey Sæwulf took a dromund from Jaffa in May 1103. The galley was attacked near Acre by Saracen ships, but soldiers onboard defended the vessel allowing it to escape. They were attacked again on the voyage from Cyprus to Constantinople by pirates. Sæwulf's account abruptly ends after recounting passage through the Dardanelles.

Pilgrimage
In 1839 Sæwulf's report was edited into French by Armand d'Avezac and from that translated into English by Thomas Wright who included it as the section "The Travels of Sæwulf" in his 1848 anthology "Early Travels in Palestine". Though details of Sæwulf's life after his pilgrimage are uncertain, he is generally thought to be the Sæwulf (or Seuulfus) of Worcester mentioned by the distinguished English historian William of Malmesbury in his "Gesta Pontificum Anglorum" as a merchant who in his old age became a monk in Malmesbury Abbey in Wiltshire, England.

See also
 Sea in culture
 Daniel the Traveller

References

Work

12th-century English writers
English travel writers
Christian pilgrimages
Christian writers
Holy Land travellers
Pilgrimage accounts
Kingdom of Jerusalem
12th-century explorers